Daniel Baur (born 6 May 1999) is a Scottish footballer, who plays for Linlithgow Rose.

Baur came through Hearts youth system and made his first team debut in November 2017. He was loaned to Albion Rovers in January 2018, and Bonnyrigg Rose in July 2019. He was released by Hearts in May 2020.

Baur signed for Spartans shortly after his release from Hearts.

Linlithgow Rose signed Baur on loan in October 2021, which was later turned into a permanent deal on 23 November 2021.

Career statistics

References

External links

1999 births
Scottish footballers
Living people
Footballers from Edinburgh
Association football defenders
Scotland youth international footballers
Scottish Professional Football League players
Heart of Midlothian F.C. players
Albion Rovers F.C. players
Bonnyrigg Rose Athletic F.C. players
Spartans F.C. players
Linlithgow Rose F.C. players